Cristina Gutiérrez-Cortines (born 17 December 1939 in Madrid) is a Spanish politician and Member of the European Parliament with the People's Party, part of the European People's Party and sits on the European Parliament's Committee on the Environment, Public Health and Food Safety.

She is a substitute for the Committee on Budgetary Control and the Committee on Industry, Research and Energy. She is also substitute for the Delegation to the EU-Turkey Joint Parliamentary Committee, and a member of the Reconciliation of European Histories Group.

Education
 Doctor of art history
 Professor of art history
 Researcher in art and architecture, urban planning and the history of urban development as well as in the use of new technologies in the field of art history

Career
 1978-1993: Director of cultural events and evening courses, University of Murcia
 1989-1995: Director of the cultural events of La Verdad newspaper (Murcia)
 1995-1999: Minister of Education and Culture, Murcia regional government
 1995-2003: Director of the Botín Foundation course on "sustainable development and conservation of the historical and natural heritage"
 since 1999: Member of the European Parliament

See also
 2004 European Parliament election in Spain

References

External links
 
 

1939 births
Living people
People from Madrid
Education in the Region of Murcia
People's Party (Spain) MEPs
MEPs for Spain 1999–2004
MEPs for Spain 2004–2009
20th-century women MEPs for Spain
21st-century women MEPs for Spain